Frank Cicero Hansford (December 26, 1874 - December 14, 1952) was a professional baseball pitcher who played for the Brooklyn Bridegrooms. He appeared in one game for the Bridegrooms on June 9, 1898.

External links

Major League Baseball pitchers
Baseball players from Illinois
Brooklyn Bridegrooms players
19th-century baseball players
Glenwood Springs players
People from Du Quoin, Illinois
1874 births
1952 deaths
Ogden (minor league baseball) players